IX Carinae (IX Car) is a red supergiant and pulsating variable star of spectral type M2Iab in the constellation Carina. It is a member of the Carina OB1 association along the Carina Nebula.

IX Carinae is a semiregular variable star, but its properties are poorly-defined. Different sources give its brightness range as magnitude 7.2 to 8.5. or 6.87 to 7.9. The International Variable Star Index finds a period of approximately 384 days from ASAS-3 and visual observations, but also gives a possible period of 108 days.

The physical characteristics of IX Carinae are also only known approximately, partly because of an uncertain distance. If placed at the center of the Solar System, it would extend close to the orbit of the outer Asteroid Belt Jupiter.

IX Carinae has been listed as a candidate supernova close enough to Earth that pre-collapse neutrinos could be detected, allowing for observations of the star to be made from before the supernova explosion.

References

Carina (constellation)
M-type supergiants
Semiregular variable stars
Carinae, IX
052991
094096
J10502630-5958563
Durchmusterung objects
IRAS catalogue objects